Ulfe is a right tributary of the river Fulda in Hesse, Germany. It flows into the Fulda in Bebra.

See also
List of rivers of Hesse

References

Rivers of Hesse
East Hesse
Rivers of Germany